Bearings is an album of acoustic instrumental rock music by Ronnie Montrose and the last solo album released in his lifetime before his death in 2012.

Track listing 
 "All Aboard" - 2:50
 "Breathe Deep" - 2:46
 "Solid Ground" - 3:52
 "The Map is Not the Road" - 4:20
 "Morning" - 4:49
 "The Whole Truth" - 4:55              
 "Lunarization" - 4:14
 "Forever is Now" - 4:10
 "Three Wishes" - 3:20
 "She's Watching" - 5:12
 "This is Only a Test" - 3:56
 "Line of Reason" - 4:40
 "Lighthouse" -  2:45
 "Soul Repair" - 3:37

All songs written by Ronnie Montrose.

Personnel
Ronnie Montrose – Acoustic guitar, mandolin, acoustic bass guitar
Ed Roth - Keyboards
Michele Graybeal Montrose - Percussion
CJ Hutchins - Acoustic guitar on "Line of Reason"

Production
Produced by Ronnie Montrose 
Basic guitar tracks co-produced and engineered by Ronnie Montrose and David Culiner
Recorded and mixed by Ronnie Montrose at RoMoCo Studios
Mastered by Charles Choi at RoMoCo Studios

References
Ronnie Montrose; "Bearings" liner notes; RoMoCo 1999

1999 albums
Ronnie Montrose albums